Adam is a 1992 British 6-minute stop motion clay animated short film written, animated and directed by Peter Lord of Aardman Animations. It was nominated for an Academy Award for Best Animated Short and the equivalent award at BAFTA in 1992, and won two awards at the Annecy International Animated Film Festival in 1993. It is based on the beginning of the Book of Genesis. It was distributed by Aardman Animations.

Premise
The film is a "spoof of the creation of life". Adam is a man who is created by the Hand of God and is put on this lonely planet. He does silly acts and does all sorts of strange things. When God realises that Adam is lonely, he makes Adam a friend. Adam, expecting it to be Eve, gets himself ready as if for a date only to find out his new friend is a penguin.

Cast
Nick Upton as The Hand of God

Availability
The film was released on DVD in 2000 as part of a Creature Comforts collection alongside Wat's Pig (nominated for the same category at the 1996 Academy Awards) and Not Without My Handbag.

Preservation
Adam was preserved by the Academy Film Archive in 2013.

Awards and nominations
This is a list of awards and nominations of Adam:

|-
| 1992
| Christopher Moll and Peter Lord
| BAFTA Film Award for Short Animation
|  
|-
| 1992
| Peter Lord (director)
| Chicago International Film Festival Silver Plaque for Best Short Film
|  
|-
| 1993
| Peter Lord
| Annecy International Animated Film Festival Audience Award
|  
|-
| 1993
| Peter Lord
| Annecy International Animated Film Festival Special Distinction for Humour
|  
|-
| 1993
| Peter Lord
| Academy Award for Best Short Film, Animated
|  
|-
|}

References

External links
 
 Adam on YouTube
 Adam on BCDB

1992 films
1992 animated films
1990s animated short films
British animated short films
Clay animation films
Animated films without speech
Films based on the Book of Genesis
Cultural depictions of Adam and Eve
Films about God
Films directed by Peter Lord
Films set on fictional planets
Stop-motion animated short films
Aardman Animations short films
1990s stop-motion animated films
1992 short films
1990s English-language films
1990s British films